The Mount Stromlo Hydro-Power Station is a small hydro-electric power station installed on the Bendora Gravity Main in Canberra, Australia. It produces about  megawatt hours of electricity per month. Production of energy depends on the water flow into the nearby Mount Stromlo Water Treatment Plant.

It was constructed in 2000 and is operated by Icon Water, the water and sewerage utility of the Australian Capital Territory.

References

External links

 Mount Stromlo Hydro

Energy infrastructure completed in 2000
Hydroelectric power stations in the Australian Capital Territory